Morris William Hirsch (born June 28, 1933) is an American mathematician, formerly at the University of California, Berkeley.

A native of Chicago, Illinois, Hirsch attained his doctorate from the University of Chicago in 1958, under supervision of Edwin Spanier and Stephen Smale. His thesis was entitled Immersions of Manifolds. In 2012 he became a fellow of the American Mathematical Society.

Hirsch had 23 doctoral students, including William Thurston, William Goldman, and Mary Lou Zeeman.

Selected works
with Stephen Smale and Robert L. Devaney: Differential equations, dynamical systems and an introduction to chaos, Academic Press 2004 (2nd edition) 3rd edition, 2013
with Stephen Smale: Differential equations, dynamical systems and linear algebra, Academic Press 1974
Differential Topology, Springer 1976, 1997
with Barry Mazur: Smoothings of piecewise linear manifolds, Princeton University Press 1974
with Charles C. Pugh, Michael Shub: Invariant Manifolds, Springer 1977

See also
Brouwer fixed-point theorem
Chern's conjecture (affine geometry)
Differential structure
Homotopy principle
Immersion (mathematics)
Whitney embedding theorem

References

External links
Website at the University of California, Berkeley

search on author Morris Hirsch from Google Scholar

1933 births
Living people
People from Chicago
20th-century American mathematicians
21st-century American mathematicians
University of Chicago alumni
University of California, Berkeley College of Letters and Science faculty
Fellows of the American Mathematical Society
Mathematicians from Illinois
Topologists